Below of list of Caste communities and their population according to the 2011 Census of India in Uttar Pradesh.

References

Further reading